Virtuoso Guitar is an album released by Laurindo Almeida in 1977 on Crystal Clear CCS 8001.  The album was recorded direct-to-disc, and uses the 45 rpm format.  The recording is a blend of jazz and classical music.

Track listing 
Side one:
 "Yesterday" (Lennon - McCartney)
 "Jazz Tuno at the Mission" (Almeida)
 "Late Last Night" (Almeida)
Side Two:
 Radamés Gnattali (1906–1988): Sonata for Guitar and Cello in Three Movements
Allegro - Comodo 
Adagio
 Com Espirito

Source:

Personnel
 Laurindo Almeida - guitar
 Chuck Domanico - bass
 Clare Fischer - acoustic/electric piano
 Chuck Flores - drums
 Emil Richards - 'vibes'/marimba
 Aime Maurice Vereeck -  percussion
 Frederick Seykora - cello

Source:

References 

1977 albums
Instrumental albums
Laurindo Almeida albums